The 2017 Rugby Europe Women's Sevens Conference was the third level of international women's rugby sevens competitions organised by Rugby Europe during 2017. It featured one tournament hosted in Košice, Slovakia. The winners and runners up, Norway and Austria respectively, were promoted to the 2018 Trophy series.

Pool stages

Pool A

Pool B

Pool C

Knockout stage

Challenge Trophy

5th Place

Cup

Final standings

References

B
2017
Europe
2017 in Slovak sport